This is a list of songs that reached number one on the Billboard Mainstream Top 40 (Pop Songs) chart in 2014.

During 2014, a total of 20 singles hit number-one on the charts.

Chart history

See also
2014 in American music

References

External links
Current Billboard Pop Songs chart

Billboard charts
Mainstream Top 40 2014
United States Mainstream Top 40